Edward Lee Greene, also known as Gusto, is an American house producer and DJ. He is best known for his song "Disco's Revenge", which was released in 1996 and charted in several countries.

Discography

Singles

As Sounds of the Last Days

As Gusto

Production discography

References

American house musicians
Club DJs
Living people
Musicians from New Jersey
Year of birth missing (living people)